Club de Fútbol México was a football club that played in the old Mexican amateur league. It was based in Ciudad de México. It accomplished many achievements in the romantic era of the Mexican football league in the 1920s and 1930s. In that era most of the clubs were conform by English and Spaniards immigrants .

History
As the Mexican revolution was taking place in 1910, Club San Pedro de los Pinos was officially founded by a group of locals headed by Alfredo B. Cuellar, Jorge Gómez de Parada y Alberto Sierra., The club would be excepted and invited to play in the amateur league in 1912 and would take on the name of Mexico FC.

In its first years the club would obtain the 1912–13 league title after reinforcing themselves with players mainly from England, but still the club was made out of mostly Mexicans.

1912–13 Champion club 

1912-13
Nombre: México FC
Tournament: Liga Mexicana Amateur de Asociación Foot-Ball
Trainer: Antonio Sierra
Squad:

Primera División de México
This are the year by years statistics from all tournaments the club took part in the Primera Fuerza from 1912/13-1917/18, 1919/20-1929/30, 1932/33-1933/34. In 1934 the club left the league for good.

Honours

Amateur 
 Liga Amateur (1): 1912–13
 Copa Eliminatoria (1): 1920–21
 Copa Tower (1): 1913–14
 Subcampeón de liga amateur en 1915–16

See also
Football in Mexico
British Club
Albinegros de Orizaba

References

External links
Tercera División de México Official Website 

Association football clubs established in 1910
Defunct football clubs in Mexico City
1910 establishments in Mexico
1934 disestablishments in Mexico
Primera Fuerza teams
Association football clubs disestablished in 1934